Vexillum (Pusia) leucodesma is a species of small sea snail, marine gastropod mollusk in the family Costellariidae, the ribbed miters.

Description
The shell size varies between 11 mm and 20 mm

Distribution
This species is distributed in the Indo-West Pacific and the Philippines.

References

 Turner H. 2001. Katalog der Familie Costellariidae Macdonald, 1860. Conchbooks. 1–100
page(s): 40

External links
 
 Reeve, L. A. (1844-1845). Monograph of the genus Mitra. In: Conchologia Iconica, or, illustrations of the shells of molluscous animals, vol. 2, pl. 1-39 and unpaginated text. L. Reeve & Co., London.

leucodesma
Gastropods described in 1845